This is a list of official U.S. state sports as recognized by state legislatures.

Table

See also
 List of U.S. state, district, and territorial insignia
 National sport

References

External links